Avdy Andresson (15 November 1899 in Viluvere, Estonia – 27 August 1990 in Deerfield, New Jersey, United States) was the Estonian Minister of War in exile from April 3, 1973, until two months before his death on June 20, 1990, and disputed   from 14 October 1975.

Life
Born and raised in Estonia, which was then part of the Russian Empire, Andresson served in the Czarist Cavalry during World War I. During the Estonian War of Independence against Bolshevist Russia from 1918 until 1920 Andresson served in the 1st Cavalry Regiment of the Estonian Army and from 1920 to 1940 in the Cavalry Regiment and the Ministry of War's Horse Breeding Station as a non-commissioned officer and a veterinarian.

During the Soviet invasion and occupation of Estonia in 1940, during World War II, Andresson served in Wehrmacht Cavalry division from 1940 until 1945.

Following Germany's defeat Andresson fled to the United States of America with his second wife Hilda Andresson (née Vilms, the widow of Juhan Piirimaa). In 1960, he was elected president of the Union of Estonian Freedom Fighters. For years, he published a monthly Estonian Freedom Fighters bulletin called Virgats, and was instrumental in the construction of a granite monument in their honor on the grounds of the Lutheran Church in Northville, New Jersey. From 1973 until 1990, Andresson served as the Minister of War in Exile.

Andresson died in Deerfield, New Jersey, and was interred at the Northville Estonian Lutheran Cemetery in Cumberland County, New Jersey. His wife Hilda died in 1995 and was interred next to him.

Acknowledgements
Order of the Cross of the Eagle, Class III. 24 February 1938.

References

External links
Northville Estonian Lutheran Cemetery, Cumberland County, New Jersey
The Estonian community of Seabrook, New Jersey: From Displaced Persons Camp to Success in America, booklet.
Ancestry Message Board post

1899 births
1990 deaths
People from Põhja-Pärnumaa Parish
People from the Governorate of Livonia
Government ministers of Estonia
Imperial Russian Army personnel
Estonian military personnel of World War I
Estonian military personnel of the Estonian War of Independence
German Army personnel of World War II
Estonian emigrants to the United States
Estonian World War II refugees
Recipients of the Military Order of the Cross of the Eagle, Class III